Darreh-ye Abbas (also Romanized as Darreh-ye ‘Abbās) is a village in Qaedrahmat Rural District, Zagheh District, Khorramabad County, Lorestan Province, Iran. At the 2006 census, its population was 248, in 44 families.

References 

Towns and villages in Khorramabad County